Meglena Plugchieva is a former Bulgarian Deputy Prime Minister, ambassador to Germany and member of the Bulgarian National Assembly from the Socialist Party.  She has been Ambassador to Montenegro since 2019.

“Iron Meggy” was recalled from Germany in 2008 “to clean up widespread corruption and misuse of European Union funds.”

She has a degree in forest management and environmental studies at the University of Forestry, Sofia.

References

Living people
Year of birth missing (living people)
Ambassadors of Bulgaria to Montenegro
Bulgarian women ambassadors
Ambassadors of Bulgaria to Germany
Members of the National Assembly (Bulgaria)
Bulgarian Socialist Party politicians
21st-century Bulgarian women politicians
21st-century Bulgarian politicians